Jonathan Marchessault (né Audy-Marchessault; born December 27, 1990) is a Canadian professional ice hockey forward for the Vegas Golden Knights of the National Hockey League (NHL). He has previously played for the Columbus Blue Jackets, Tampa Bay Lightning, and Florida Panthers.

After being selected by the Golden Knights in the 2017 NHL Expansion Draft, Marchessault has been one of the key points of the team offense, and helped Vegas become the first expansion team to reach the Stanley Cup Finals in their inaugural season since the 1967-68 St. Louis Blues. During the 2018 season, he was signed by the Golden Knights to a six-year, $30 million contract extension.

Playing career
As a youth, Marchessault played in the 2003 and 2004 Quebec International Pee-Wee Hockey Tournaments with a minor ice hockey team from Rive-Nord, Quebec.

Junior
Marchessault played his entire junior hockey career with the Quebec Remparts in the Quebec Major Junior Hockey League (QMJHL). He originally joined the team as a 16-year-old for the 2007–08 season after being drafted by them in the 12th round.

In the 2009–10 season, Marchessault won the Gaétan Duchesne Trophy as the QMJHL's best defensive player. He was also named Player of the Week in both the QMJHL and Canadian Hockey League (CHL) for the week ending December 13, 2010.

As Quebec's alternate captain in his final junior hockey season, Marchessault finished sixth in the QMJHL in scoring during the regular season. He also led the League in game-winning goals for the season, with 11. In the 2011 playoffs, he led the QMJHL in scoring despite Quebec having been eliminated in the semi-finals; he became the first player to lead the QMJHL in playoff scoring despite not playing in the final round.

Marchessault was named the QMJHL Top Star of the Week for the week ending September 19, 2010. He was also named CHL Player of the Week for the week ending April 3, 2011, during the QMJHL playoffs. At the end of the season, Marchessault was awarded the Bud Light Cup as Quebec's player of the year. Moreover, he was named a QMJHL First Team All-Star.

Professional

Connecticut Whale
Not having been selected in any NHL Entry Draft, on June 23, 2011, Marchessault signed his first professional contract with the New York Rangers' American Hockey League (AHL) affiliate, the Connecticut Whale, on a recommendation by Dean Stork, coach of the ECHL's Greenville Road Warriors. Upon signing, Marchessault joined former Rempart teammates Ryan Bourque and Kelsey Tessier within the Rangers organization. Marchessault began his professional career in 2011–12 with the Whale.
 

On October 9, 2011, in his second professional game, Marchessault scored the game-winning shootout goal against the Wilkes-Barre/Scranton Penguins. He scored his first professional non-shootout goal on October 22, 2011, in a game against the Springfield Falcons. In his first professional season, Marchessault tied for the Whale team lead with 64 points, leading the team with 40 assists and adding 24 goals.

Columbus Blue Jackets
After the 2011–12 season, Marchessault did not re-sign with the Whale, instead signing a three-year, entry-level contract as a free agent with the Columbus Blue Jackets. He played the following season for Columbus' AHL affiliate Springfield Falcons, leading the team in scoring and being named a First Team AHL All-Star.

Beginning with the 2013–14 season, Marchessault dropped "Audy" from his last name. In his second season with Columbus, on March 5, 2014, that season's trade deadline, he was traded with Dalton Smith to the Tampa Bay Lightning in exchange for Dana Tyrell and Matt Taormina.

Tampa Bay Lightning
On April 11, 2015, the Lightning called Marchessault up from the AHL's Syracuse Crunch to replace an ill Jonathan Drouin in the final game of the regular season. Upon his call-up to the NHL, Marchessault had played in 64 games with Syracuse, leading the team with 41 assists and 64 points. He was also second on the team in goals (23) and tied for second in power play goals (6). On April 11, he scored his first career NHL goal and point in a Tampa Bay's 3–2 shootout victory over the visiting Boston Bruins; he was also named the game's first star by the attending media. The next day, on April 12, the Lightning reassigned Marchessault to Syracuse to join them for the remainder of the regular season and the playoffs. After the Crunch were eliminated from the AHL playoffs, Marchessault was recalled to practice with the team as one of the "Black Aces," an extra player to fill in for possible injuries on the roster. As a result of Ryan Callahan's emergency appendectomy, Marchessault made his Stanley Cup playoff debut in a 4–1 Lightning win over the Montreal Canadiens, eliminating the latter from the playoffs.

On June 28, 2015, the Lightning re-signed Marchessault to a one-year, two way contract. Marchessault appeared in two Stanley Cup Playoff games with the Lightning. He also appeared in two games during the regular season, recording one goal. This was his first career goal, which was scored on April 11, 2015. In addition, Marchessault played in 68 AHL games with the Syracuse Crunch, ranking sixth in the league in assists (43).

Florida Panthers
After three seasons within the Lightning organization, Marchessault left as a free agent and signed a two-year, one-way contract with the Florida Panthers on July 1, 2016. In the 2016–17 season, Marchessault got off to a quick start offensively with the Panthers, and enjoyed a breakout season. In becoming one of the best value signings from the previous summer, Marchessault in his first full NHL season led the Panthers with 30 goals in recording 51 points in 75 games. He was the first Panther to reach 30 goals since David Booth in 2009.

Vegas Golden Knights
On June 21, 2017, having been exposed by the Panthers, Marchessault was selected by the Vegas Golden Knights in the 2017 NHL Expansion Draft. On January 3, 2018, Marchessault signed a six-year, $30 million extension with the Golden Knights. With 75 points in the regular season and 21 points in the Stanley Cup Playoffs, Marchessault established himself as one of the league's elite wingers. He led the team in post-season scoring with eight goals as the Golden Knights reached the Stanley Cup Finals in their inaugural season.

He would score 25 goals to go with 34 assists during the 2018–19 NHL season, as the Golden Knights would once again battle the San Jose Sharks in the 2019 Stanley Cup playoffs. Marchessault would score the game-tying goal in Game 7 of the Western Conference Quarter Finals in the final minute of the game, though the Sharks would eventually win in overtime. Afterwards, he was very outspoken about the major penalty call in the third period to teammate Cody Eakin, who cross-checked Sharks forward Joe Pavelski who fell to the ice awkwardly and subsequently began bleeding from his head. The penalty resulted in the Sharks scoring four power-play goals to take a 4–3 lead.

Marchessault scored his first career playoff hat trick for the Golden Knights against the Colorado Avalanche on Sunday, June 6, 2021 in Game 4 of their second round Stanley Cup Playoffs matchup, helping Vegas to tie the series at 2-2.

International play

On April 29, 2019, Marchessault was selected to his maiden international tournament after he was named to the Team Canada roster for the 2019 IIHF World Championship, held in Slovakia. Placed on Canada's first line he helped Canada progress through to the playoff rounds before losing the final to Finland to finish with the Silver Medal on May 26, 2019. Marchessault finished the tournament contributing with 3 goals and 10 points in 10 games.

Personal life
Marchessault was known as Jonathan Audy-Marchessault early in his career. He dropped Audy from his legal surname in 2013, in order to shorten it for his child. 

Marchessault is married to Alexandra and they have four children together. The family resides in Summerlin, Nevada.

Career statistics

Regular season and playoffs

International

Awards and honours

References

External links

 

1990 births
Living people
Canadian ice hockey centres
Columbus Blue Jackets players
Connecticut Whale (AHL) players
Florida Panthers players
Ice hockey people from Quebec City
People from Sainte-Foy–Sillery–Cap-Rouge
Quebec Remparts players
Springfield Falcons players
Syracuse Crunch players
Tampa Bay Lightning players
Undrafted National Hockey League players
Vegas Golden Knights players